Hotel de Paree is a Western television series starring Earl Holliman that aired thirty-three episodes on the CBS Friday evening from October 2, 1959, until September 23, 1960, under the alternate sponsorship of the Liggett & Myers company (L&M cigarettes) and Kellogg's.

Format

The show starred Holliman as Sundance, a gunfighter just released after 17 years in prison. In the first episode, he is in Georgetown, Colorado, where he kills the town villain and is then urged by the citizens to become the marshal. He accepts the job and also becomes a part owner of the Hotel de Paree, owned by two French women, Annette Deveraux, played by Jeanette Nolan, and her niece, Monique (Judi Meredith), relatives of the man whom he had earlier killed. Sundance wore a string of polished silver dollars in the band of his black Stetson, which often blinded his adversaries.

During the run of the series, Sundance dealt with assorted antagonists and maintained flirtations with both of the Deveraux women. Sundance also befriended a local shopkeeper, Aaron Donoger, played by veteran Western performer Strother Martin. The program was filmed at CBS Studio Center.  On the evening of the series debut broadcast, October 2, 1959, star Earl Holliman also appeared an hour later in the premiere episode of The Twilight Zone, "Where Is Everybody?", which also aired on CBS.

Paperback Novel
In 1959, Gold Medal Books published Sundance as by "Richard Telfair" (pseudonym of Richard Jessup), an original novel based on the series.

Comic Book
A single issue featuring an original story written by Gaylord Du Bois appeared in Dell's Four Color series (#1126).

Episode list

References

External links
 
 Video clips of Two openings and One close of episodes of Hotel de Paree

1950s Western (genre) television series
CBS original programming
1959 American television series debuts
1960 American television series endings
Television shows set in Colorado
Black-and-white American television shows
Television series by CBS Studios
English-language television shows
Fictional hotels
1960s Western (genre) television series